Lockwood Terrace is a populated place on the island of Guam with an elevation of 22 metres above sea level. It is located in the village of Santa Rita, between Apra Harbor and Agat Bay on the Orote Peninsula.

References

Populated places in Guam